The Summer Book (in the original Swedish, Sommarboken) is a book written by Finnish author Tove Jansson in 1972.

Plot

An elderly woman and her six-year-old granddaughter Sophia spend a summer together on a tiny island in the Gulf of Finland exploring, talking about life, nature, everything but their feelings about Sophia's mother's death and their love for one another.

Reception

The novelist Ali Smith, reviewing the book in The Guardian, wrote that Jansson was better known for her Moomin books than for her novels, and that with her worldwide fame, she knew the virtues of withdrawal. In Smith's view, The Summer Book is an astonishing achievement of artistry, "the writing so lightly kept, so simple-seeming, so closely concerned with the weighing of moments that any extra weight of exegesis is too much." Telling the tale of the child and her grandmother in the simplest language, Smith writes, "The threat of brevity, even on this timeless island in this timeless, gorgeous summer, is very marked. But Jansson's brilliance is to create a narrative that seems, at least, to have no forward motion, to exist in lit moments, gleaming dark moments, like lights on a string, each chapter its own beautifully constructed, random-seeming, complete story. Her writing is all magical deception, her sentences simple and loaded; the novel reads like looking through clear water and seeing, suddenly, the depth." Smith praises Thomas Teal's English translation as "original and stunning".

The journalist Antonia Windsor described it as "like a meditation on life and love and surviving in the natural world. It is a wonderfully humane and gentle book."

The New York Review of Books writes that Jansson's characters, the girl and her grandmother, "discuss things that matter to young and old alike: life, death, the nature of God and of love."

The novelist Philip Pullman described the book as "a marvelous, beautiful, wise novel, which is also very funny."

Lucy Knight, celebrating the book's 50th anniversary in The Guardian, quotes the novelist Ali Smith's description of The Summer Book, "a masterpiece of microcosm, a perfection of the small, quiet read". Knight adds that Sophia Jansson – Tove's niece and the real-life model for the character of the granddaughter Sophia, thinks that Tove was "poking fun" at what people consider normal. In her view, the island allowed the Janssons, like the book's characters, to shape their own sort of "normality". Tolerance and care for nature were essential virtues. 

Charlie McDowell is directing a film adaptation based on the book. It will star Glenn Close.

See also 

 Signe Hammarsten-Jansson – Jansson's mother and the real-life model for the character of Sophia's grandmother.

References

1972 novels
20th-century Finnish novels
Swedish-language literature
Novels set on islands
Swedish-language novels